The Ligier JS23 was a Formula One car designed by Michel Beaujon and Claude Galopin for the Ligier team for use in the 1984 Formula One season. The car was powered by a turbocharged Renault V6 engine and ran on Michelin tyres. Drivers of the car during 1984 were François Hesnault and Andrea de Cesaris.

1984 wasn't a successful year for Ligier with de Cesaris scoring all three points Ligier earned meaning the French team finished 9th in the Constructors Championship. De Cesaris actually scored the three points with a 5th place at the 2nd race of the season in South Africa and a 6th place two races later in San Marino.

The JS23 was replaced for the  season by the Ligier JS25.

Complete Formula One results
(key)

References

External links
Ligier JS23 at Chicane F1
Ligier JS23 at the Formula One DataBase

1984 Formula One season cars
Ligier Formula One cars